Assarpur is a small village in the district of Ropar, Punjab, India.

Villages in Rupnagar district